Thérèse Couderc (1 February 1805 – 26 September 1885) - born Marie-Victoire Couderc - was a French Roman Catholic professed religious and the co-founder of the Sisters of the Cenacle. Couderc underwent humiliations during her time as a nun for she was forced to resign from positions and was ridiculed and mocked due to false accusations made against her though this softened towards the end of her life. She was a spiritual writer having written on sacrifice and service to God. After her death, she left a series of spiritual writings.

Pope Pius XII beatified the late religious in Saint Peter's Basilica on 4 November 1951 and in 1970 she was canonized as a saint by Pope Paul VI.

Life
Marie-Victoire Couderc was born in 1805 in Le Mas as the fourth of twelve children to farmers Claude Michel Corderc (1780-???) and Anne Méry; her parents married in 1801. One sibling was Jean and two others died in their childhood. The surviving children were eight males and two females that included herself (she was the eldest of the girls). In her childhood she attended Mass twice a week. She made her First Communion on Pentecost on 15 May 1815.

In 1822 her parents sent her to a boarding school at Vans and she remained there until 1825 in Lent when her father wanted her to attend a school in their local area. She entered the novitiate after she had met Father Jean-Pierre Etienne Terme in late March 1825 and confided in him her desire to become a religious. Couderc underwent her period of the novitiate in 1825 with the Sisters of Saint Regis, a teaching order in Lalouvesc; she made her perpetual vows on 6 January 1837 with one other. Couderc assumed a religious name when she became a novice.

Couderc and two other sisters were sent to manage a mountain hostel for women pilgrims at the shrine of St. John Francis Regis in Lalouvesc. It became a successful retreat house under her guidance. Couderc co-founded the Sisters of the Cenacle with Father Terme in 1826 and became its superior in 1828. Desirous to provide women a place for recollection in solitude, prayer, and meditation, they resolved to open houses where women might follow the exercises of a retreat.

When the motherhouse was established, Couderc became superior general. In 1828 Terme began to hold Ignatian retreats for the sisters. He continued to do so until his death in December 1834. After Terme's death the order split into the Sisters of Saint Regis who retained their teaching ministry, and the Congregation of Our Lady of the Cenacle, which continued its retreat ministry. The Jesuits then led the retreats.

The regular school teaching of the hostel was separated from the retreats, and this resulted in financial hardship for the sisters. Although she was not at fault, Couderc accepted responsibility. This led, in October 1838, to the Bishop of Viviers Abbon-Pierre-François Bonnel de la Brageresse to remove her from her office and replace her with a new novice as the "Foundress Superior"; Couderc resigned in full on 27 October 1838. The novice led for a few months but did so bad a job the bishop removed her. The Jesuit advisers began replacing her with a succession of wealthy women.

In 1842 she was sent for almost eighteen months alone with one other sister to a small house in Lyon; in 1852 she went to Paris. In November 1856 she was appointed as the superior of the Tournon house until it was to be sold off and so she returned to Lyon. On 20 October 1859 a Jesuit gave a retreat on the topic of Christian sacrifice that had a profound impact on her. At the end of August 1860 she was sent to the house at Montpellier but its closure in 1867 saw her return to Lyon once more.

In the beginning of 1885 she fainted and was unconscious for several hours in an occurrence that left her bedridden until her death. Couderc died on 26 September 1885 and was buried in Lalouvesc.

Sainthood
The beatification cause commenced in an informative process that opened in France in 1920 and concluded its work in 1921 which then led to the approval of all of her spiritual writings from theologians on 23 July 1924; the informative process was validated by the Congregation of Rites on 13 July 1927. The formal introduction to the cause came on 18 July 1927 in which she was titled as a Servant of God - the first official stage in the process.

Pope Pius XI proclaimed Couderc to be Venerable on 12 May 1935 after he confirmed that the late nun lived a life of heroic virtue. Pope Pius XII beatified her on 4 November 1951 after approving two miracles attributed to her intercession while the cause was resumed in a decree issued on 26 July 1953. Pope Paul VI canonized Couderc as a saint on 10 May 1970 after approving two more miracles attributed to her intercession.

Spirituality

To Surrender Oneself
In 1864 Couderc wrote:

I understand the full extent of the expression to surrender oneself, but I cannot explain it. I only know that it is very vast, that it embraces both the present and the future.

To surrender oneself is more than to devote oneself, more than to give oneself, it is even something more than to abandon oneself to God. In a word, to surrender oneself is to die to everything and to self, to be no longer concerned with self except to keep it continually turned toward God.

To surrender oneself is, moreover, no longer to seek oneself in anything, either for the spiritual or the physical, that is to say, no longer to seek one's own satisfaction, but solely the divine good pleasure.

It should be added that to surrender oneself is also to follow that spirit of detachment which clings to nothing, neither to persons nor to things, neither to time nor to place. It means to adhere to everything, to accept everything, to submit to everything.

But perhaps you will think that this is very difficult to do. Do not let yourself be deceived. There is nothing so easy to do, nothing so sweet to put into practice. The whole thing consists in making a generous act once and for all, saying with all the sincerity of your soul: "My God, I wish to be entirely thine; deign to accept my offering." And all is said. But from then on, you must take care to keep yourself in this disposition of soul and not to shrink from any of the little sacrifices which can help you advance in virtue. You must always remember that you have surrendered yourself.

I pray to our Lord to give an understanding of this word to all souls desirous of pleasing him and to inspire them to take advantage of so easy a means of sanctification. Oh! If people could just understand ahead of time the sweetness and peace that are savored when nothing is held back from the good God! How he communicates himself to the one who seeks him sincerely and has known how to surrender herself. Let them experience it and they will see that here is found the true happiness they are vainly seeking elsewhere.

The surrendered soul has found paradise on earth.

Goodness
In 1866, Couderc reported having a vision of goodness which was a defining moment for her life and spirituality, and which she describes in a letter to Mother de Larochenégly:

A few days ago, I saw something that consoled me very much. It was during my thanksgiving, when I was making a few reflections on the goodness of God — and how would it be possible not to think of this in such moments: of this infinite goodness, uncreated goodness, source of all goodness! And without which there would be no goodness, neither in people nor in other creatures.

I was extremely touched by these reflections, when I saw written as in letters of gold this word Goodness, which I repeated for a long while with an indescribable sweetness. I saw it, I say, written on all creatures, animate and inanimate, rational or not — all bore this name of goodness. I saw it even on the chair which I was using for a kneeler. I understood then that all that these creatures have of good and all the services and help that we receive from each of them are a blessing that we owe to the goodness of our God, who has communicated to them something of his infinite goodness, so that we may meet it in everything and everywhere.

References

Sources
 Paule de Lassus, rc, "Thérèse Couderc, 1805-1885: la femme - la sainte" (Lyon: Lescuyer,1985) 
 
 Saint Thérèse Couderc / Šv. Teresė Kudirka. (Livre). R.S. Butautas-Kudirka. Publisher Gediminas p. 210. Vilnius. 2015.

External links

 Cenacle Sisters
 Hagiography Circle
 Saints SQPN
 Writings of Saint Therese Couderc

1805 births
1885 deaths
Beatifications by Pope Pius XII
Canonizations by Pope Paul VI
Founders of Catholic religious communities
French Roman Catholic saints
19th-century French nuns
People from Ardèche
Venerated Catholics